Josh Lewis (born 5 October 1985 in Sydney, New South Wales is an Australian rugby league footballer who most recently played for Toulouse Olympique.  Lewis previously played for the Gold Coast Titans and Sydney Roosters in the National Rugby League competition.

Playing career
A Leichhardt junior and lower grader with the St George and Sydney Roosters clubs, Lewis made his first-grade debut playing for the Roosters in 2006. Looking to gain a regular starting position, Lewis was granted a release from his contract and joined the Gold Coast Titans midway through the 2007 season. In his debut match for the Gold Coast against South Sydney Rabbitohs he set up two tries and kicked a field goal.

Lewis played for the Balmain Tigers in 2009, and was unable to get a run in the Wests Tigers team. Lewis was signed by the Cronulla Sharks for the 2010 season, linking with former coach Ricky Stuart.

Lewis signed with Toulouse in Co-operative Championship in France for 2011.

In 2018, Lewis joined Ron Massey Cup side the Guildford Owls.

In 2021, Lewis signed for Ron Massey Cup side, the Hills District Bulls.

Sources
 Whiticker, Alan & Hudson, Glen (2006) The Encyclopedia of Rugby League Players, Gavin Allen Publishing, Sydney

References

External links
NRL profile
Gold Coast Titans profile

1985 births
Living people
Australian rugby league players
Gold Coast Titans players
Rugby league five-eighths
Rugby league halfbacks
Rugby league players from Sydney
Sydney Roosters players
Toulouse Olympique players